Idaho Central Arena (originally Bank of America Centre, formerly Qwest Arena and CenturyLink Arena) is a multi-purpose arena in the western United States, located in Boise, Idaho. Its seating capacity is 5,002 for ice hockey, 5,300 for basketball, 5,732 for end-stage concerts, 6,400 for boxing, and up to 6,800 for center-stage concerts. With 4,508 permanent seats, it was built for $50 million.

Opened , it has been the home arena of the Idaho Steelheads of the ECHL since 1997. Other tenants include the Boise Stallions of the Indoor Professional Football League in 2000 and 2001, the Idaho Stampede of the NBA Development League from 2005 to 2016, and the Boise Burn of the af2 from 2007 to 2009.

Originally the Bank of America Centre, it became Qwest Arena in 2005. With CenturyLink's takeover of Qwest Communications in 2011, the venue was renamed on August 18 that same year. On September 16, 2020, Idaho Central Credit Union purchased the naming rights, giving the building its current title.

Features
The arena features 39 corporate suites, 1,100 Club Premiere seats, standing room space for 200, The Zone restaurant (overlooking the arena), as well as a Blimpie franchise among the nine concession stands. The arena is physically connected to the Grove Hotel at the corner of Front Street and Capitol Boulevard; the main entrance is from the Grove Plaza. There are two scoreboards and a Daktronics ProStar videoboard.

Events
Idaho Central Arena hosted the 2006 CBA All-Star Game (while the Idaho Stampede were still part of the CBA) and the 2007 ECHL All-Star Game.

Other events hosted in the facility include concerts, trade shows, conventions, ice shows and various other sporting events, including professional wrestling, MMA, and the Treasure Valley Rollergirls roller derby squad. 

On July 14, 2018, the arena was host to UFC Fight Night 133, the MMA promotion's first event held in Idaho.

Idaho Central Arena has hosted two NBA D-League Showcases in 2008 and 2010. Each Showcase had all NBA D-League teams play for 4 days, and showed their talent in front of National TV (NBA TV) and had scouts all around the country.

On September 18, 2017, the Big Sky Conference announced that its men's and women's basketball tournaments would move to Idaho Central Arena for three years, starting in 2019. The previous three years (2016–18) were held in Reno, Nevada.

Concerts
Many artists and bands have performed at the venue, including Judas Priest, Godsmack, Five Finger Death Punch, Shinedown, Skillet, Luke Bryan, Yes, Ringo Starr and his All Starr Band, and Rise Against.

References

External links
 Idaho Central Arena
 IdahoSteelheads.com

Basketball in Boise, Idaho
Indoor ice hockey venues in the United States
Idaho Stampede
Convention centers in Idaho
Defunct NBA G League venues
Sports venues in Idaho
Lumen Technologies
Buildings and structures in Boise, Idaho
Tourist attractions in Boise, Idaho
Ice hockey in Idaho
Sports venues completed in 1997
1997 establishments in Idaho
Continental Basketball Association venues
Indoor arenas in Idaho